Trident (also known as MSHTML) is a proprietary browser engine for the Microsoft Windows version of Internet Explorer, developed by Microsoft.

MSHTML debuted with the release of Internet Explorer 4 in 1997. For versions 7 and 8 of Internet Explorer, Microsoft made significant changes to MSHTML's layout capabilities to improve compliance with Web standards and add support for new technologies.

MSHTML will continue to receive security updates for the IE mode of Microsoft Edge until at least 2029. However, support for new Web standards will not be added.

Use in software development
MSHTML was designed as a software component to allow software developers to easily add web browsing functionality to their own applications. It presents a COM interface for accessing and editing web pages in any COM-supported environment, like C++ and .NET. For instance, a web browser control can be added to a C++ program and MSHTML can then be used to access the page currently displayed in the web browser and retrieve element values. Events from the web browser control can also be captured. MSHTML functionality becomes available by linking the file  to the software project.

Release history

Use cases
All versions of Internet Explorer for Windows from 4.0 onwards use MSHTML, and it is also used by various other web browsers and software components (see Internet Explorer shells). In Windows 98, Windows Me, and Windows 2000, it is also used for the Windows file manager/shell, Windows Explorer. The Add/Remove Programs tool in Windows 2000 uses MSHTML to render the list of installed programs, and in Windows XP it is also used for the User Accounts Control Panel, which is an HTML Application. MSHTML, however, was not used by Internet Explorer for Mac (which used Tasman starting with version 5.0), nor by the early versions of Internet Explorer Mobile.

Some other MSHTML-based applications include:
AOL Explorer, a web browser
AOL Instant Messenger 6.x, which uses MSHTML to render conversation and profile windows, and advertisement panels
Avant Browser
EA Link, incompatible with MSHTML as of Internet Explorer 7 RC2
Flashpoint Secure Player, uses MSHTML to run ActiveX based web games
Google Talk, which used MSHTML to render chat windows and profile cards
GreenBrowser, which is also presented at the BrowserChoice.eu page
IE Tab, a Firefox and Google Chrome add-on used to render pages with MSHTML within the Firefox or Chrome user interface.
Impulse (content delivery), uses MSHTML to render "Explore" page, as well as several of the "Community" pages
LimeWire, which renders the page 'New@Lime'
Lunascape, developed by Lunascape Corporation
Maxthon, which uses the MSHTML engine while adding features not built into IE7
MediaBrowser, customized browsers, especially for Nintendo
MenuBox, a web browser
Microsoft Compiled HTML Help
 Microsoft Encarta and related products
Microsoft InfoPath
Microsoft Outlook which uses MSHTML to render HTML Messages (prior to Outlook 2007) and the "Outlook Today" screen
 Microsoft Outlook Express, which uses MSHTML to render HTML Messages
 Microsoft Visual InterDev 6 uses MSHTML in editing mode as visual HTML designer
 Microsoft Visual Studio 2002-2005 use MSHTML in editing mode to provide visual ASP.NET/HTML designer
 Microsoft Visual Studio and Visual Basic to render the WebBrowser control
MSN Messenger, which uses it to produce Flash-based "winks" and games, and for all advertisements shown in the advertisement banner
NeoPlanet, a web browser
NetCaptor, a web browser
Netscape Browser (Netscape 8), which used MSHTML to render web pages in IE mode
Pyjs, a python Widget set Toolkit. Embedding IWebBrowser2 as an Active-X component and accessing the COM interface, Pyjs uses MSHTML for the Desktop version, through the python win32 "comtypes" library.
RealNetworks
Sleipnir, a web browser
SlimBrowser, a web browser
Skype, software for VoIP that renders HTML data with MSHTML
Tencent Traveler, a web browser
Valve's Steam client, previous versions of which used MSHTML to render the "Store", "Update News" and "Community" sections as well as the Steam in-game browser and MOTD screens in Valve games. The Steam client was updated to use WebKit instead of MSHTML for these features. Then was updated further to use the Chromium Embedded Framework.
Windows Live Writer, which uses MSHTML for its editor
Windows Media Player, which uses MSHTML to render the "Media Information" pages
WinRAR, A decompression program.
360 Secure Browser, a web browser in China
Baidu Browser, a web browser in China, that also had a proxy for some websites

Standards compliance
Current versions of MSHTML, as of Internet Explorer 9 have introduced support for CSS 3, HTML5, and SVG, as well as other modern web standards. Web standards compliance was gradually improved with the evolution of MSHTML. Although each version of IE has improved standards support, including the introduction of a "standards-compliant mode" in version 6, the core standards that are used to build web pages (HTML and CSS) were sometimes implemented in an incomplete fashion. For example, there was no support for the <abbr> element which is part of the HTML 4.01 standard prior to IE 8. There were also some CSS attributes missing from MSHTML, like min-height, etc. as of IE 6. As of Internet Explorer 8 CSS 2.1 is fully supported as well as some CSS 3.0 attributes. This lack of standards compliance has been known to cause rendering bugs and lack of support for modern web technologies, which often increases development time for web pages. Still, HTML rendering differences between standards-compliant browsers are not yet completely resolved.

Microsoft alternatives
Apart from MSHTML, Microsoft also has and uses several other layout engines. One of them, known as Tasman, was used in Internet Explorer 5 for Mac. Development of Internet Explorer for Mac was halted in roughly 2003, but development of Tasman continued to a limited extent, and was later included in Office 2004 for Mac. Office for Mac 2011 uses the open source WebKit engine. Microsoft's now defunct web design product, Expression Web as well as Visual Studio 2008 and later do not use Internet Explorer's MSHTML engine, but rather a different engine.

In 2014, MSHTML was forked to create the engine EdgeHTML for Microsoft Edge on Windows 10. The new engine is "designed for interoperability with the modern web" and deprecates or removes a number of legacy components and behaviors, including document modes, ensuring that pure, standards-compliant HTML will render properly in browsers without the need for special considerations by web developers. This resulted in a completely new browser called Microsoft Edge (now referred to as "Microsoft Edge Legacy"), which replaced Internet Explorer as a stock browser of Windows and a base of Microsoft's web related services until its replacement with a Blink and Chromium based Microsoft Edge in late 2020.

See also
Comparison of browser engines

References

External links
 

Internet Explorer
Layout engines